François Manfred André Göske (born 18 March 1989 in Saint-Doulchard, Cher, Sologne, France), known professionally as François Goeske, is a French-German actor, voice talent and musician.  He currently lives in Munich, Germany.

Biography 

Goeske's parents nurtured his musical talent in his childhood.  During that time he also discovered his passion for the stage.  At the age of nine he was accepted into the children's choir of the Bavarian State Opera in Munich.  With them he was on stage performing as a soloist in La Boheme and Pique Dame, among other performances. He appeared as a leading actor in the Uli Brees musical Teddy – a Musical Dream.

He had his first part in a theatrical film as "Kreuzkamm Junior" in The Flying Classroom in 2003. Shortly afterwards he lent his singing voice to Mowgli in the German version of Jungle Book 2. Aside from other dubbing assignments, Goeske could be seen in various TV shows. In 2004 production commenced on the shoot of Joseph Vilsmaier's , which hit the German film theaters in the winter of 2004/2005. In that film Goeske played the lead role of Konrad. For this achievement he received the Junior Media Award 'White Elephant' at 2005's Filmfest München and a nomination for the International Undine Award (together, among others, with Alexandra Maria Lara, Tom Schilling, Mavie Hörbiger, Kostja Ullmann and Robert Stadlober).

In the summer of 2005, Goeske played the lead in the German-French theatrical feature French for Beginners (with co-stars like Christian Tramitz, among others), which was distributed in 2006 by Concorde Film in Germany. For this film, Goeske was again nominated for an International Undine Award in the fall of 2006.

In 2007, Goeske played "Jim Hawkins" in the new TV version of the adventure classic Treasure Island. At his side were, among others, performers like Tobias Moretti, and Jürgen Vogel. Right after that he shot a re-make of the anti-war classic The Bridge with Franka Potente.

In the summer of 2008, Goeske was hired as the protagonist of the film adaptation of Summertime Blues; the English young adult novel by Julia Clarke of the same name.

In the fall of 2008, Goeske earned his third nomination for the International Undine Award, this time for his performance in Treasure Island.

In 2010, Goeske played alongside Liv Lisa Fries in the youth drama  by author and director Thomas Stiller. For his depiction he was awarded the Wild and Young Awards as best actor in 2012.

In 2011 he took the leading part in Lost Place, a 3-D mystery thriller directed by Thorsten Klein, which hit German theaters in 2013 (NFP/Warner Bros.). In the film version of the novel  (directed by Ute Wieland; written by Nina Pourlak) he also can be seen as the protagonist. The German theatrical release was in 2014.

A special TV event in 2014 was the music video "Traum" from Panda-Rapper Cro, which was simultaneously played in heavy rotation by MTV and local music broadcaster VIVA, in which Goeske was playing the two lead characters in a double role.

From 2015 to 2017, Goeske has been playing the title role in the successful ARD youth mystery series Arman's Secret.

In 2018/2019, Goeske starred in the MDR Sputnik web series Findher as a young man, who tries to overcome his breakup with his girlfriend with the help of a dating app. In 26 episodes, he meets a wide variety of women and in the end learns to find himself anew.

Since 2020, Goeske has been part of the main cast of the new ZDF crime series Blutige Anfänger (Rookies).

Goeske has been a member of the German Film Academy (Deutsche Filmakademie) since 2011.

Filmography (excerpt)

Awards 

International Undine Award
 2005:    Best leading actor | Rock Crystal | nom.
 2006:    Best comedian | French for Beginners | nom.
 2008:    Best leading actor | Treasure Island | nom.

Filmfest München »White Elephant Award«
 2005:    Special acting award | »White Elephant«  | Rock Crystal

CMA Wild and Young Awards
 2008:    Best actor national | silver | Treasure Island
 2008:    Most popular male celebrity national | silver
 2009:    Best actor national | silver | The Bridge
 2010:    Best actor national | bronze | Summertime Blues
 2012:    Best actor national | gold | She deserved it

International Filmfestival Cinepécs Hungary
 2010:    Best actor national | bronze Best Feature | Summertime Blues | nom.

International Filmfest Emden
 2009:    Best actor national | bronze Bernhard Wicki Award | Summertime Blues | nom.
 2009:    Best actor national | bronze NDR Film Award | Summertime Blues | nom.
 2009:    Best actor national | bronze EZetera Film Award | Summertime Blues | nom.

Hachenburger Filmfest
 2009:    Youth Review Award »Young Lion« | Summertime Blues

Deutsche Film- und Medienbewertung
 2009:    Rating »valuable« | Summertime Blues
 2004:    Rating »high valuable« | Rock Crystal
 2002:    Rating »valuable« | The Flying Classroom

Festival International de Programmes Audiovisuels
 2008:    Best Mini Series | Treasure Island | nom.

Giffoni Film Festival (Hollywood)
 2007:    Best Film 15-17 | French for Beginners

Tallinn Black Nights Film Festival (Just Film)
 2007:    Audience Award | French for Beginners

Sprockets Toronto – International Film Festival for Children
 2007:    Audience Award | French for Beginners

WorldFest-Houston International Film Festival
 2007:    Special Jury Remi | French for Beginners

German Film Award
 2003:    Best Children‘s Film | The Flying Classroom

Golden Sparrow
 2003:    Best Feature | The Flying Classroom

Notes

References

External links 

 
 Official Facebook Support
 united actors | agency
 
 planet interview (German)
 Portrait moviesection.de (2009) (German)
 Portrait Süddeutsche Zeitung (2012) (German)

1989 births
Living people